Charaxes durnfordi, the chestnut rajah, is a butterfly found in India that belongs to the rajahs and nawabs group, that is, the Charaxinae group of the brush-footed butterflies family.

Description
Male upperside brown, the basal third of fore and nearly the basal half of the hindwing chestnut-brown, the remainder of the forewing dark brown, of the hindwing white suffused inwardly with pale greenish yellow. Forewing with a very incomplete discal and a more complete postdiscal transverse series of more or less crescentic white markings, followed by a few terminal white specks. Hindwing: the inner margin of the white area irregularly and deeply crenulate, the brown on the basal half projecting along the veins into the white area; a sub-terminal row of white-centred brown ocelli without outer rings, increasing in size anteriorly, and a terminal series, often absent, of slender sagittate brown markings on the veins, the points outwards, followed by an anteciliary exceedingly slender brown line. Cilia, forewing and hindwing, white alternated with brown. Underside. purplish brown; a broad discal irregular black-edged darker purple-brown sinuous band across both wings, paler on the hindwing than on the fore, followed by a more or less continuous line of dark lunules, and beyond it a postdiscal series of slightly yellowish-brown lunular markings, bordered outwardly on forewing by pale purple, on hindwing by the series of ocelli of the upperside showing faintly through. Antennae blackish brown finely annulated with white; head, thorax and abdomen chestnut-brown; purplish brown beneath.

Range
Myanmar and parts of Southeast Asia.

See also
Charaxinae
Nymphalidae
List of butterflies of India
List of butterflies of India (Nymphalidae)

References

Further reading
Rothschild, W. And Jordan, K., 1900 A monograph of Charaxes and the allied prionopterous genera. Novitates Zoologicae 7:[i-iv], 287-524.

External links
Charaxes durnfordi images at Consortium for the Barcode of Life
Charaxes durnfordi durnfordi images at BOLD 

durnfordi
Butterflies of Asia
Butterflies of Indochina
Butterflies described in 1884